George Hoadley (May 16, 1867 – December 14, 1955) was a long serving popular provincial politician and rancher from Alberta, Canada. Hoadley served a legendary career in the Alberta legislature during the early years when he led the Alberta Conservative Party in opposition and his effect in shaping policy in the province is widely remembered to this day as he served a broad range of portfolios during his years in the United Farmers government.

Early political career
Hoadley was born at Abbey, England and came to Canada in 1890. Hoadley first ran for public office in the 1902 Northwest Territories general election. He was defeated in the High River electoral district by Richard Wallace

Hoadley ran again for a seat in the Alberta Legislature seven years later. He won his seat in 1909 Alberta general election in the newly created electoral district of Okotoks. Hoadley won a hotly contested and very close election against Liberal candidate M. McHardy. He served his first term in the Legislative Assembly in the opposition Conservative caucus.

Hoadley sought a second term in office standing for re-election in the 1913 Alberta general election. He retained his seat, increasing his margin of victory.

Hoadley was re-elected to a third term in office again with increased plurality in the 1917 Alberta general election. His third term saw him assume the reins as the Conservative Party leader and become Leader of the Official Opposition.

Opposition leader
Hoadley having been one of the most senior Conservative MLAs led the Alberta Conservative Party and became leader of His Majesty's Loyal Opposition in Alberta for three years. He took over the party's leadership from Edward Michener in 1917 after Michener resigned from the Legislature to take a seat in the Senate of Canada.

Hoadey was stripped of his leadership of the Conservatives at a caucus meeting in 1920. Members of the Conservative caucus decided James Ramsey should temporarily be the new leader.

United Farmers
Hoadley switched party affiliations in 1921 after being removed as leader of the Conservatives. He crossed the floor to the unproven United Farmers of Alberta political party. He was acclaimed at a nomination meeting as the Okotoks candidate on July 9, 1921.

Hoadley would stand for re-election in his Okotoks district for the 1921 Alberta general election under the United Farmer banner. He was re-elected with a landslide taking about 74% of the popular vote. The switch in parties had worked to his favor and he was the only member from the Conservative caucus that had kept his seat in that election..

Hoadley's prior years of experience in the legislature made him a very valuable asset to the new government and he was sworn into his first cabinet post. Hoadley was given the Minister of Agriculture portfolio in the new United Farmers government by Premier Herbert Greenfield. He was re-elected by acclamation in a Ministerial By-election in December 1921.

Hoadley's Okotoks electoral district would be abolished prior to the 1930 Alberta general election to form the Okotoks—High River electoral district, along with the northern portion of the High River electoral district, and a small portion of the Rocky Mountain electoral district. Hoadley would contest, and win a decisive victory in the new district against former Mayor of Okotoks from 1928 to 1929 and Liberal candidate Malcolm MacGougan.

Hoadley served as Minister of Agriculture (1921-1934), Minister of Public Health (1923-1935), Provincial Secretary (1925-1926), and Minister of Railways and Telephones (1935-1936) during the 15 years of the UFA government.

Sexual sterilization
Hoadley was one of the primary architects behind the Sexual Sterilization Act one of the most controversial pieces of legislation in Alberta history.

Defeat
With the United Farmers of Alberta sagging in popular support in the midst of the Great Depression, Hoadley attempted to run for a record 7th term in office. When the returns of the 1935 Alberta general election had come in Hoadley in his Okotoks riding that he had held since its inception in 1909. The result of the vote had him defeated in a landslide. The plurality Social Credit candidate William Morrison was just over 2000 votes, putting Hoadley a distant second place in the standings out of four candidates. His career of a record 26-consecutive years in the legislature came to an end.

Hoadley served as an elected member of the executive for the Western Livestock Union. He died in 1955 in Victoria, British Columbia.
 
The hamlet of Hoadley, Alberta was named in his honor. In addition to the town the Hoadley Post Office in Haverigg, Alberta was also renamed in his honor in 1924.

References

External links
Legislative Assembly of Alberta Members Listing

1866 births
1955 deaths
Leaders of the Progressive Conservative Association of Alberta
Progressive Conservative Association of Alberta MLAs
United Farmers of Alberta MLAs
Members of the Executive Council of Alberta
Canadian eugenicists
English emigrants to Canada